Diachlorus is a genus of biting horseflies of the family Tabanidae. D. ferrugatus ranges from the southeastern United States to Costa Rica. There are 27 species with a neotropical distribution, with the greatest diversity in Brazil, while 3 are found in Central America.

Species
Diachlorus afflictus (Wiedemann, 1828)
Diachlorus aitkeni Fairchild, 1972
Diachlorus altivagus Lutz, 1913
Diachlorus anduzei Stone, 1944
Diachlorus bicinctus (Fabricius, 1805)
Diachlorus bimaculatus (Wiedemann, 1828)
Diachlorus bivittatus (Wiedemann, 1828)
Diachlorus curvipes (Fabricius, 1805)
Diachlorus distinctus Lutz, 1913
Diachlorus fairchildi Henriques & Rafael, 1999
Diachlorus falsifuscistigma Henriques & Rafael, 1999
Diachlorus fascipennis Lutz, 1913
Diachlorus ferrugatus (Fabricius, 1805)
Diachlorus flavitaenia Lutz, 1913
Diachlorus fuscistigma Lutz, 1913
Diachlorus glaber (Wiedemann, 1828)
Diachlorus habecki Wilkerson & Fairchild, 1982
Diachlorus heppneri Wilkerson & Fairchild, 1982
Diachlorus immaculatus (Wiedemann, 1828)
Diachlorus jobbinsi Fairchild, 1942
Diachlorus leticia Wilkerson & Fairchild, 1982
Diachlorus leucotibialis Wilkerson & Fairchild, 1982
Diachlorus neivai Lutz, 1913
Diachlorus nuneztovari Fairchild & Ortiz, 1955
Diachlorus pechumani Fairchild, 1972
Diachlorus podagricus (Fabricius, 1805)
Diachlorus scutellatus (Macquart, 1838)
Diachlorus tenuimaculatus Henriques & Krolow, 2020
Diachlorus trevori Wilkerson & Fairchild, 1982
Diachlorus varipes (Rondani, 1848)
Diachlorus xynus Fairchild, 1972

References

Tabanidae
Diptera of North America
Diptera of South America
Taxa named by Carl Robert Osten-Sacken
Brachycera genera